Dhaka Bypass Expressway is an  
under construction controlled-access highway located in the division of Dhaka. The project is a section of Asian Highway 1. The primary purpose of construction was to reduce heavy traffic on access roads and highways through the city of Dhaka.

History
Before the construction of the expressway, there was a road here called Dhaka Bypass Road. According to the report of Bangladesh Pratidin, the government had long ago thought of converting this road into an expressway and many discussions were going on about it.

The conversion project named 'Support to Joydebpur–Debgram–Bhulta–Madanpur Road' was approved by the government in September 2012. After 4 years Executive Committee of the National Economic Council gave approval for implementation of works related to the project. Initially, the government took the initiative to construct a 45 km flyover highway on this road. But it could not be implemented due to complications in ministries.

On 6 December 2018, the government signed a public-private partnership agreement with Sichuan Road and Bridge Group, Shamim Enterprise and UDC Construction Limited to implement the project to convert the road into an expressway. Under the construction project, there were plans to construct overpasses, underpasses and bridges at various places on the expressway. Asian Development Bank is responsible for financial consultancy of this project.

However, the project deadline of June 2020 has passed for land acquisition and financing work. Therefore, the project implementation period is extended by another 4 years. On 22 June 2021, Executive Committee of the National Economic Council approved the project again after revision.

The government increased its own share in the budget by another . Sichuan Road and Bridge Group, Shamim Enterprises and UDC Construction Limited jointly formed the Dhaka Bypass Expressway Development Company. The company formed for the project has been given the opportunity to collect tolls for 23 years after the time of establishment of the expressway.

Construction
Its construction started on 26 December 2019. In June 2021, The Daily Star reported that land acquisition for the project was 73% complete. After 24 April 2022, the construction of the expressway was speeded up due to the loan assistance of Bangladesh Infrastructure Finance Fund Limited.

References

Roads in Dhaka
Expressways in Bangladesh
AH1
Purbachal
Gazipur District
Narayanganj District